Gift of Gab is a 1934 black-and-white film released by Universal Pictures. Edmund Lowe stars as a man with the "Gift of Gab"—he can sell anyone anything. The film costars Ruth Etting, Ethel Waters, Victor Moore, and Gloria Stuart, and features Boris Karloff and Béla Lugosi. The film's sets were designed by the art director David Garber.

Ruth Etting sings "Talking to Myself" and "Tomorrow, Who Cares?" Originally the Three Stooges were signed to appear in the film, but they had just signed with Columbia Pictures for Woman Haters, the first of their short subjects, so three look-alike actors replaced them in Gift of Gab.

Cast
 Edmund Lowe – Phillip "Gift of Gab" Gabney
 Gloria Stuart – Barbara Kelton
 Ruth Etting – Ruth
 Phil Baker – absent-minded doctor
 Ethel Waters – Ethel
 Alice White – Margot
 Alexander Woollcott – cameo appearance
 Victor Moore – Colonel Trivers
 Hugh O'Connell – Patsy
 Helen Vinson – nurse
 Gene Austin – radio artist
 Tom Hanlon – radio announcer
 Henry Armetta – janitor
 Andy Devine – McDougal, the waiter
 Wini Shaw – cabaret singer
 Boris Karloff – cameo appearance
 Béla Lugosi – cameo appearance
 Roger Pryor as himself

See also
 List of American films of 1934
 Boris Karloff filmography
 Béla Lugosi filmography

External links

1934 films
1934 musical comedy films
American black-and-white films
American musical comedy films
Films directed by Karl Freund
Universal Pictures films
Films with screenplays by Philip G. Epstein
1930s English-language films
1930s American films